The slaty-backed flycatcher (Ficedula erithacus) is a species of bird in the family Muscicapidae.

It is found in Bhutan, Cambodia, China, India, Laos, Myanmar, Nepal, and Thailand. Its natural habitats are subtropical or tropical moist lowland forests and subtropical or tropical moist montane forests.

References

Further reading

slaty-backed flycatcher
Birds of Nepal
Birds of Bhutan
Birds of China
Birds of Yunnan
slaty-backed flycatcher
slaty-backed flycatcher
Taxonomy articles created by Polbot